Jai Kishen is a 1994 Bollywood action drama film directed by Sunil Agnihotri. It stars Akshay Kumar in a dual role, Ayesha Julka and Chandni. It was the first film where Akshay Kumar appeared in a dual role. It was an average grosser at the box office. One of the characters that Akshay Kumar played was a visually impaired man. He later played a similar role in the 2002 film Aankhen.

Plot

The story revolves around the twin brothers named 'Jai' and 'Kishen'. When they were at childhood goons of Anand Rao Anthya kills their father and they are separated. Jai grows up with his widowed mother, and is blind and has the sixth sense and Kishen stay in city with his girlfriend Anita and he becomes a wanted thief.

Kishen and Anita were Huge wanted crooks who can do anything for money. One day Jai Goes to bank and their some goons attack and tries to highjack the bank  Jai was keeping a stick with him every time which were used by the blind people's  but inside the stick there was a long sword and he used it at the emergency time, the goons pick up the one of the customer's child present with her mother and they blackmail to give money others wise they will kill that child, Jai uses his sixth sense and his sword he kills the goons and saves the child, by seeing Jai's talents the child's mother gives him cheque of 4 lakh rupees and that news was posted on newspapers. Next day Kishen and Anita see that newspaper and Anita argues with Kishan that although he won the 4 lakh rupees and he did not inform her. Kishen arrives that he is his look alike and Kishen tries to uses his identity for stealing the things and he thinks that police will arrest Jai. The next day Kishen and Anita visit four jewellery shops and giving that duplicate cheque and steal jewelleries and run run away and they all cells that jewellery and make some money. Next day all the owners of jewelry shops comes to police station and complaint against the Jai that he had stolen our jewelries and police calls Jai to police, but Jai provides evidence that he was at hospital being treated for his blindness and police arrived that it was a Jai's lookalike who is using his identity to steal the things. After hearing that word from the police their mother gets shocked and also comes to arrive that Kishen is still alive. The next day, the owners of the jewellery shop complain to the Chhote bhai who was the younger brother of Anand Rao Anthya. Chhote Bhai asks Kishen to return the jewellery, Kishan responds that Chhote bhai should give him influence in return for the jewelries but when he goes there, Kishen gives him counterfeit versions of the jewellery and takes his money and tries to escape. Chhote bhai follows him and tries to catch him but Kishen kills him.

The matter comes of marriage of Jai when his mother asked about his marriage to Jai. Asha was a childhood friend of Jai. Asha was also a little crook who steals little things and also wants to love Jai and finally they fall in love. After some Kishen tries to trap Jai in his every crook activities by using his identity. When  Jai asks to his mother that who is this Kishen  and why he wants to make a trap in his crimes by using his identity. Without tolerating  his mother tells him everything what was happened when they were in childhood and also tells that Kishen is none other than he is your identical twin brother who was separated when they were at childhood when their father was murdered. When Jai discovers that Kishan is his twin brother Jai tries to find him. Their mother thought that Kishen was dead but when she learns that he is alive Jai tries to bring him home but police was searching him at every directions. One day at  night the largest thunderstorm was going on and inside the temple there they both brothers meat each other Kishen also discovers that Jai is his brother, Kishan tells him that truth I was a thief was making you to trap in my criminal activities so please forgive me after that they both of them hug each other and caries after meeting long time. The brothers reunite and kill Anand Roy Anantya and his gang. Police arrives to arrest the brothers but their mother requests that they do not, and they do not. Kishen reunites with his mother and his brother and they unite with their lovers, Jai with Asha and Kishen with Anitha.

Cast

 Akshay Kumar as  Jai Verma / Kishen Verma (dual role)
 Ayesha Jhulka as  Asha Verma
 Chandni as  Anita 
 Reema Lagoo as  Mrs. Verma "Jai/Kishen's"  Mother
 Arun Bakshi as  Police Inspector
 Avtar Gill as  Inspector Pratap Singh
 Vikas Anand as  Commissioner of Police
 Tinu Anand as  Anand Rao Antya
 Mahavir Shah as  Chhote Bhai 
 Viju Khote as  Havaldar Shevde
 Deepak Shirke as  Kaalia Shirke
 Harish Patel as  Putarmal
 Sparsh Puri as  child artist
 Mohit Vaya as  child artist

Soundtrack

The music was composed by Anand–Milind and the lyrics authored by Sameer. The song Jhoole Jhoole Lal, was based on Nusrat Fateh Ali Khan's Dam Mast Kalendar and was a hit when released.

External links 
 

1994 films
1990s Hindi-language films
Films scored by Anand–Milind
Twins in Indian films
Indian action drama films
Films directed by Sunil Agnihotri
1990s action drama films